Sandusky Township is one of the eighteen townships of Richland County, Ohio, United States.  It is a part of the Mansfield Metropolitan Statistical Area.  The 2020 census found 1,002 people in the township, 1,002 of whom lived in the unincorporated portions of the township.

Geography
Located in the western part of the county, it borders the following townships:
Sharon Township - north
Springfield Township - east
Troy Township - southeast, north of Troy Township, Morrow County
Troy Township, Morrow County - southeast corner, north of Troy Township, Richland County
North Bloomfield Township, Morrow County - south
Polk Township, Crawford County - southwest
Jackson Township, Crawford County - northwest

A small part of the city of Crestline is located in northwestern Sandusky Township along with a part of Galion City.

Name and history
Statewide, other Sandusky Townships are located in Crawford and Sandusky counties.

Government
The township is governed by a three-member board of trustees, who are elected in November of odd-numbered years to a four-year term beginning on the following January 1. Two are elected in the year after the presidential election and one is elected in the year before it. There is also an elected township fiscal officer, who serves a four-year term beginning on April 1 of the year after the election, which is held in November of the year before the presidential election. Vacancies in the fiscal officership or on the board of trustees are filled by the remaining trustees.

FIRE/EMS
Fire and EMS services are contracted to Springfield Township Fire/EMS. Operating from two stations located in Springfield and Ontario City Richland County.

References

External links
Township website
County website

Townships in Richland County, Ohio
Townships in Ohio